Needmore can refer to:

 Needmore, Arkansas
 Needmore, Brantley County, Georgia
 Needmore, Echols County, Georgia
 Needmore, Brown County, Indiana
 Needmore, Lawrence County, Indiana
 Needmore, Vermillion County, Indiana
 Needmore, Ballard County, Kentucky
 Needmore, Owen County, Kentucky
 Needmore, Missouri
 Needmore, Bailey County, Texas
 Needmore, Delta County, Texas
 Needmore, Nacogdoches County, Texas
 Needmore, Terry County, Texas
 Needmore, Virginia
 Needmore, West Virginia
 Needmore, the Virginia home of William Overton Callis
 Needmore, Pennsylvania, a real life town referenced in the "Hiatus" episode of television show 30 Rock